Paul Lewis Joskow (born June 30, 1947) is an American economist and professor.  He became President of the Alfred P. Sloan Foundation on January 1, 2008.  He is also the Elizabeth and James Killian Professor of Economics, Emeritus at MIT. He has served on the MIT faculty since 1972. From 1994 through 1998 he was Head of the MIT Department of Economics. From 1999 through 2007 he was the Director of the MIT Center for Energy and Environmental Policy Research. Since rejoining in 2018 from his 1988-2007 term, Professor Joskow is Research Associate on the National Bureau of Economic Research (NBER).

In his research and teaching, Joskow focuses on industrial organization, government regulation of industry, competition policy, and energy and environmental economics.

Educational career 
Upon completion of his PhD in economics at Yale University in 1972, Joskow began his career at MIT July 1, 1972 in the Economics Department. While teaching here, he received numerous awards - including honors from the Public Research Institution (1993), University of Florida, Best Paper Award (1993) International Association for Energy Economics, Edward A. Hewlett Award for the Advancement of Slavic Studies (1995), and the Distinguished Service Award, MIT School of Humanities and Social Sciences (1998). From 1994-1998, Joskow served as the head of the MIT Department of Economics.

Among his many fellowships, Paul Joskow served in international organizations of his specialties in environmental and industrial economics. These include the Scientific Advisory Board of the Institut d'Economie Industrielle and the Fondation Jean-Jacques Laffont in Toulouse, France, and as a chair of the National Academies Board on Science, Technology and Economic Policy (STEP). Recently, Joskow has joined the Secretary of Energy Advisory Board (SEAB).

He served as President of the Yale University Council from 1993 - 2006. Professor Joskow is a past-President of the International Society for New Institutional Economics, a Distinguished Fellow of the Industrial Organization Society, a distinguished Fellow of the American Economic Association, a Fellow of the Econometric Society, a Fellow of the American Academy of Arts and Sciences,  a Fellow of the Econometric Society, and a member of the Council on Foreign Relations.

Personal life and education 
Joskow was born in Brooklyn and raised in Queens. His father, Jules Joskow, was also an economist; Jules received his PhD in Economics from Columbia University, and co-founded NERA Economic Consulting. He graduated from Francis Lewis High School, as part of the school's second graduating class. Joskow received a BA from Cornell University in 1968, an MA in Philosophy and Economics in 1970 from Yale University, and a PhD in Economics from Yale University in 1972. Joskow was also a recipient of an Honorary Doctorate from the University of Paris – Dauphine in 2007.

In 1978 Joskow married Barbara Chasen, and the couple currently reside in both Boston and New York City. They have one daughter, Suzanne Zoe Joskow, born in 1983. She graduated from Yale College in 2005 and now works in Hollywood, California.

His nephew is the blogger Matthew Yglesias.

Selected publications 
Joskow has published six books and over 125 articles in numerous journals and books.

Joskow, Paul Lewis (1972). A Behavioral Theory of Public Utility Regulation. Ph.D. dissertation, Yale University, United States—Connecticut.
Electric Power in the United States: Models and Policy Analysis (with Martin Baughman and Dilip Kamat), MIT Press, 1979.
Controlling Hospital Costs: The Role of Government Regulation, MIT Press, 1981.
Markets for Power: An Analysis of Electric Utility Deregulation (with Richard Schmalensee), MIT Press, 1983.
"Publicly Owned Electric Utility Profits and Resource Allocation: Comment," Land Economics, August, 1971.

Honors, Awards, and Fellowships 

 Paul Lewis Joskow graduated Cornell University Pi Beta Kappa (1968).
 Joskow is a Woodrow Wilson fellow at the Woodrow Wilson Institute of International Relations, Princeton University. 
 Following a fellowship at National Science Foundation (1969-1972), Joskow joined the Center for Advanced Study in the Behavioral Sciences (1985-1986) 
 Joskow joined the American Academy of Arts and Sciences as a fellow (1991), before receiving the following awards: 
 Distinguished Service Award, Public Utility Research Center, University of Florida (1993), International Association for Energy Economics, Best Paper Award (1993), and Edward A. Hewett Prize (with Richard Schmalensee and Natasha Tsukanova).   
 Later in his career, Joskow received the Yale Medal (November 2005) and Gordon Y. Billard Award (MIT - 2006).
 Joskow received the Distinguished Fellow Award, American Economic Association (2013)

Other involvements 
Joskow is a Fellow of the Yale Corporation, the governing body of Yale University; a member of the Board of Overseers of the Boston Symphony Orchestra; a director of Exelon Corporation and a trustee of the Putnam Mutual Funds. He previously served as a director of the Whitehead Institute of Biomedical Research, the New England Electric System, State Farm Indemnity Company, TransCanada Corporation, and National Grid plc.  Joskow is also a Distinguished Fellow of the American Economic Association, a Fellow of the Econometric Society, the Industrial Organization Society, and the American Academy of Arts and Sciences.  He is a member of the Council on Foreign Relations and serves on the Secretary of Energy Advisory Board (SEAB). Additionally, Joskow continues to provide his expertise on the U.S. EPA's Acid Rain Advisory Committee and on the Environmental Economics Committee of the EPA's Science Advisory Board.

Notes 

1947 births
Economists from New York (state)
Cornell University alumni
Distinguished Fellows of the American Economic Association
Environmental economists
Fellows of the American Academy of Arts and Sciences
Fellows of the Econometric Society
Francis Lewis High School alumni
Living people
MIT Sloan School of Management faculty
People from Brooklyn
People from Queens, New York
Yale University alumni
20th-century American economists
21st-century American economists